The 1900–01 United States Senate elections were held on various dates in various states, coinciding with President William McKinley's re-election as well as the 1900 House of Representatives elections. As these U.S. Senate elections were prior to the ratification of the Seventeenth Amendment in 1913, senators were chosen by state legislatures. Senators were elected over a wide range of time throughout 1900 and 1901, and a seat may have been filled months late or remained vacant due to legislative deadlock. In these elections, terms were up for the senators in Class 2.

Both the Republicans and the Democrats gained two seats at the expense of various third parties and vacancies. Special elections were held to fill vacant seats in Pennsylvania, Utah, and Montana (of which the Republicans won the two former and Democrats the latter) as well as to replace appointees in Minnesota, Nebraska, and Vermont (all of which were carried by the Republicans). Republicans flipped Democratic-held seats in Minnesota, as well as a Populist seat in Nebraska and a Silver Republican held seat in South Dakota. The Silver Republican party kept itself to net neutral gain by flipping a Republican held seat in Idaho. The Democratic party, meanwhile, flipped Republican held seats in Montana and Colorado as well as a Populist held seat in North Carolina.

In Nebraska and Montana's special election, senators were elected shortly after the beginning of the 57th Congress on March 4. In Delaware, the legislature again failed to elect a candidate, leaving both senate seats vacant– the only time a state has gone without representation in the Senate since the first Congress.

Results summary 
Senate party division, 57th Congress (1901–1903)

 Majority party: Republican (55)
 Minority party: Democratic (29)
 Other parties: Populist (2); Silver Republican 2; Vacant 2
 Total seats: 90

Change in Senate composition

Before the elections 

At the beginning of 1900.

Result of the general elections

Beginning of the next Congress

Race summaries

Elections to the 56th Congress 
In these elections, the winner was seated in the current (56th) Congress during 1900 or in 1901 before March 4; ordered by election date.

Elections to  the 57th Congress 
In these general elections, the winners were elected for the term beginning March 4, 1901; ordered by state.

All of the elections involved the Class 2 seats.

Early election to the 58th Congress 
In this election, the winner was seated in the 58th Congress, starting March 4, 1903.

Elections during the 57th Congress 
In these elections, the winners was elected in 1901 after March 4 and seated in the 57th Congress.

Pennsylvania (special) 

The special election in Pennsylvania was held on January 15, 1901, after the regularly scheduled legislative election in January–April 1899 failed to elect a Senator. Former Senator Matthew Quay, who had left the Senate for nearly two years because of the political stalemate, was again elected by the Pennsylvania General Assembly to the United States Senate.

Republican Matthew Quay was re-elected by the Pennsylvania General Assembly, consisting of the House of Representatives and the Senate, in the 1893 election. With Sen. Quay's term expiring on March 4, 1899, the General Assembly convened on January 18, 1899, to elect a Senator for the next term. Between January 18 and April 19, 1899, seventy-nine ballots were recorded in an attempt to elect a Senator. Instead, the legislature adjourned sine die without electing a Senator due to a dispute between Sen. Quay's political machine and an anti-Quay faction within the Republican Party, along with Democratic Party opposition.

Sen. Quay's term expired on March 4, 1899. Since a Senator had not been elected for the successive term, the seat was vacated. At the time, Quay was under indictment for misuse of funds. He was acquitted, after which Governor William Stone appointed Quay to the vacated Senate seat (a power the Governor did not legally have until the ratification of the 17th Amendment to the U.S. Constitution in 1913). The Senate refused to recognize Quay's appointment, and the seat remained vacant until a Senator could be officially elected (which would ultimately be Quay himself, after a nearly two-year hiatus). This incident, among others, would later be cited by supporters of the 17th Amendment, which mandated the direct election of U.S. Senators.

The Pennsylvania General Assembly convened on January 15, 1901, for a special election to elect a Senator to serve out the remainder of the term that began on March 4, 1899. The results of the vote of both houses combined are as follows:

|-  style="background:#eee; text-align:right"
| colspan=3 | Totals
| 254
| 100.00%
|}

See also 
 1900 United States elections
 1900 United States presidential election
 1900 United States House of Representatives elections
 56th United States Congress
 57th United States Congress

Notes

References 

 Party Division in the Senate, 1789-Present, via Senate.gov